Peter Grassberger (born 17 May 1940) is a professor well known for his work in statistical and particle physics. He is most famous for his contributions to chaos theory, where he introduced the idea of correlation dimension, a means of measuring a type of fractal dimension of the strange attractor.

Work
Grassberger's early work focused on particle phenomenology, in particular on the formulation of formally exact equations for three-body scattering and bound state scattering (Alt-Grassberger-Sandhas equation).

While working at CERN, he realized that reggeon field theory can be viewed as a contact process in the same universality class as directed percolation. After making this discovery, Grassberger turned his attention to the studies of statistical physics, dynamical systems, sequential sampling algorithms, and complex systems. His publications span a variety of topics including reaction-diffusion systems, cellular automata, fractals, Ising model, Griffiths phases, self-organized criticality, and percolation.

He held long-term positions at the University of Wuppertal and at the Forschungszentrum Jülich (Germany).

In 2017 he received the EPS Statistical and Nonlinear Physics Prize.

See also
 Correlation dimension
 Self-organized criticality
 Complex network
 Percolation
 Epidemic models on lattices
 Mutual information
 Forecasting complexity
 Kolmogorov entropy

Selected publications

References

External links
 Peter Grassberger's Homepage

Austrian physicists
People associated with CERN
Academic staff of the University of Calgary
Living people
1940 births